The following lists events from 1997 in Indonesia.

Incumbents
 President – Suharto
 Vice President – Try Sutrisno

Events
 23 May
 Manusela National Park established
 Riots take place in Banjarmasin on the last day of campaigning before elections, killing at least 130 people.
 29 May – Legislative elections
 September – Forest fires break out due to a prolonged drought and last into 1998.
 26 September – Garuda Indonesia Flight 152 crashes in Northeastern Sumatra killing all 234 people on board.
 11 October–19 October – The Southeast Asian Games take place in Jakarta.
 Lorentz National Park established.

Births
 16 March – Diananda Choirunisa, archer

References

 
Indonesia
Indonesia
1990s in Indonesia
Years of the 20th century in Indonesia